1999 World Masters Athletics Championships is the thirteenth in a series of World Masters Athletics Outdoor Championships (called World Veterans Championships or World Veterans Athletics Championships at the time) that took place in Gateshead, England from 29 July to 8 August 1999.
An official website was established for the first time in this series: http://www.gatesheadmbc.gov

The main venue was Gateshead International Stadium; some stadia events were held at Riverside Stadium and Monkton Stadium.

This edition of masters athletics Championships had a minimum age limit of 35 years for women and 40 years for men.

The governing body of this series is World Association of Veteran Athletes (WAVA). WAVA was formed at the inaugural edition of this series at Toronto in 1975, then officially founded during the second edition in 1977.
During General Assembly on 5 August at this Championships, a proposed amendment to change the name of the organization from WAVA to World Association of Masters Athletes (WAMA) was defeated,

though the name would eventually be changed to World Masters Athletics (WMA) at the Brisbane Championships in 2001.

This Championships was organized by WAVA in coordination with a Local Organising Committee (LOC) led by Mike Newton.

In addition to a full range of track and field events,
non-stadia events included 10K Cross Country, 10K Race Walk (women), 20K Race Walk (men), and Marathon.

Results
Past Championships results are archived at WMA.
Additional archives are available from British Masters Athletic Federation

as a pdf newsletter,

from Museum of Masters Track & Field

as a searchable pdf

and as National Masters News pdf newsletters.

Australian results are summarized in a Victorian Masters Athletics pdf newsletter retrospective.

Several masters world records were set at this Championships. World records for 1997 are from the list of World Records in the National Masters News September newsletter unless otherwise noted.

Key:

Women

Men

References

External links

World Masters Athletics Championships
World Masters Athletics Championships
International athletics competitions hosted by the United Kingdom
1999
Masters athletics (track and field) records